Dinorhax is a monotypic genus of melanoblossiid camel spiders with Dinorhax rostrumpsittaci being the only described species.

References 

Solifugae
Arachnid genera
Monotypic arachnid genera
Taxa described in 1879